Coles Supermarkets Australia Pty Ltd, trading as Coles, is an Australian supermarket, retail and consumer services chain, headquartered in Melbourne as part of the Coles Group.

Founded in 1914 in Collingwood by George Coles, Coles operates 807 supermarkets throughout Australia, including several now re-branded  Bi-Lo Supermarkets. Coles has over 100,000 employees and accounts for around 27 per cent of the Australian market. Coles' large head office site in Melbourne's inner south-east has 4,000 employees of the workforce located inside.

Coles Online is the company's online shopping ('click & collect' and home delivery) service.

Between 1986 and 2006, Coles Supermarkets was a brand of Coles Myer Limited, later Coles Group Limited, prior to Wesfarmers purchasing Coles Group in 2007. It became a subsidiary of Coles Group again after Wesfarmers spun-off the business in November 2018.

In 2020, Coles changed its slogan to "Value the Australian way".

History 
George James (G. J.) Coles learned the retail trade working for his father's 'Coles Store' business from 1910 to 1913. (The store continued operating as "The Original Coles" at Wilmot, Tasmania until it was destroyed by a fire on 24 January 2014.) Coles itself was founded when G. J. Coles opened the 'Coles Variety Store' on 9 April 1914 on Smith Street in the Melbourne suburb of Collingwood. Further expansion occurred and Coles' interest in food retailing was spurred in 1958 when it acquired 54 John Connell Dickins grocery stores. It then acquired the Beilby's chain in South Australia in 1959 and 265 Matthews Thompson grocery stores in New South Wales in 1960.

In 1960, the first supermarket (trading under the Dickins name) was opened in the Melbourne suburb of Balwyn North, at the corner of Burke and Doncaster Roads where a modernised version continues to operate. By 1973, Coles had established stores in all Australian capital cities. From 1962, its supermarkets were branded Coles New World with accompanying Space Age-themed imagery. In 1991, the stores were rebranded Coles Supermarkets and from 1998, simply as Coles.

In 2004, the liquor division office ("Coles Liquor Group"), was moved from Chullora in Sydney to the company head office in Hawthorn East, Melbourne. With Coles Myer CEO John Fletcher citing the move for better efficiency between the food and liquor departments. It also resulted in Craig Watkins (35-year veteran and director of Coles Liquor) retiring from the company.

From mid 2006, many Bi-Lo supermarkets were badged as Coles Supermarkets. Newmart supermarkets, under which Bi-Lo traded in Western Australia, were badged as Coles Supermarkets in 2002–2003. Newmart stores co-located with Coles in the same area or shopping centre were sold to Foodland and re branded as the now-defunct Action Supermarkets chain. The conversion program was put on hold at Easter 2007.  On 2 July 2007, Western Australian based company Wesfarmers agreed to purchase Coles Group for A$22 billion. The purchase was completed in early 2008.

In August 2007, as Wesfarmers foreshadowed its plans for the restructuring of Coles Group following its anticipated takeover, it stated that one of three planned divisions would comprise supermarkets, liquor and convenience stores.

From 2008 to 2014, Coles was run by UK retailer Ian McLeod.

In February 2011, Coles acquired National Australia Bank's 50 per cent interest in Australia's largest loyalty program Flybuys, giving it 100% ownership.

In September 2011, Coles commenced stocking private-label clothing in its stores with several stores receiving refits to accommodate the range.

In 2018 Wesfarmers announced its intention to demerge the Coles business, seeking to retain only a 20% interest going forward.

In 2018, Steven Cain was appointed as CEO of the Coles Supermarket brand as part of the demerger of Coles from Wesfarmers.

Advertising and branding

Coles' original slogan was "nothing over 2/6", when it was primarily operating variety stores. The slogan "You'll find the best value is at Coles New World" was used in the 1980s. The red/orange orb was used from 1991 to 2005, although store signs continued to use the orb up until the early 2010s. "Serving you better" was used as a slogan from 1998 to 2003, replaced by "save everyday", endorsed by actress Lisa McCune. A circled tick was used as a logo device from 2003 to 2007, replacing the orb as a primary device in 2005. "Save everyday" was later changed to the grammatically-correct "save every day".

In 2007, the slogan and circle tick were discontinued with simply the Coles name used in preparation for a new red ball logo to match proposed Coles Group livery, which was shelved later in the year as the business was sold. A number of tag lines were employed in the next few years: "Something better every day", "Proudly Australian since 1914" (introduced with its TV sponsorship of the 2008 Summer Olympics), "Cutting the cost of your shopping", "Quality food costs less at Coles" and "It all counts". The slogan "Good things are happening at Coles" was rolled out in 2018, and its current slogan "Value the Australian way" was employed in 2020.

In the 1960s, Coles sponsored a general knowledge quiz show, Coles £3000 Question (later Coles $6000 Question and Coles $7000 Question) which aired on Channel 7.

In 2010, Coles launched a new sub-slogan, "Down Down, Prices Are Down", featuring a large red cartoon hand pointing downwards to symbolise the chain's low price policy. The slogan incorporates the tune of "Down Down", a 1975 hit by British rockers Status Quo.
In 2011, the campaign was revised to the fit the tune of Petula Clark's 1964 hit "Downtown". but reverted to "Down Down" later in the year.
In 2012, it used Status Quo, which originally recorded the song in 1975, singing and speaking in the newest ad in the series. In February 2016, Coles updated the "Down Down" campaign again, to the tune of That's Amore ("it's a Down Down").
In May 2017 the "Down Down" campaign was again refreshed with Australian Idol and reality TV contestant Casey Donovan with a new disco version of the advertisement. This was ultimately dropped in March 2018, with Coles commercials (mostly on its in-store radio known as Coles Radio) using Best of My Love by The Emotions, a hit disco song from 1977, instead.

Radio

Coles Radio is the brand name for the in-store radio station heard across all Coles' supermarkets. It is owned and operated in partnership with broadcaster NOVA Entertainment and adopts a hot adult contemporary format, featuring a playlist consisting of pop hits from the 80s, 90s and current hits. The station is also available outside stores via Coles' website, and on DAB+ digital radio (making it accessible in many newer car models).

Internet retailing

Accusations of anti-competitive practices
Coles has been accused by suppliers of using heavy-handed tactics when dealing with its suppliers. A 2004 investigation by the Australian Competition and Consumer Commission did not result in any action being brought against Coles and Woolworths.  A 2012 investigation in which suppliers were offered anonymity is believed to have uncovered unethical practices.  In 2013, the ACCC was investigating both Coles and Woolworths over accusations that they used improper market practices to force down prices from suppliers.

Legal cases
A 2014 Federal Court of Australia case ruled that Coles "threatened harm to suppliers if they didn't meet their demands," and ordered the chain to pay $10 million in penalties.

In 2015, the Federal Court of Australia fined Coles $2.5 million for making misleading claims in relation to the sale of its par-baked bread products.

Notable promotions 

4-cents-per-litre fuel offer: When a customer spends $30 or more in a single transaction at a Coles, BI-LO, Pick'n'Pay or Liquorland, they receive a four-cent discount coupon on their receipt for use at Coles Express service stations. This practice has been criticised by competition law experts who argue that people pay higher petrol and grocery prices to fund these discounts.

Shoppers can collect flybuys loyalty program points at Coles Group businesses.
Between 1991 and 1993, Coles Supermarkets ran a promotion in conjunction with Apple Inc. and 12 major suppliers entitled "Apples for Students", where students collected grocery dockets and returned them to their participating school, and once a certain value had been reached the school would be provided with a free Macintosh computer. Seventy per cent of Australia's schools and kindergartens participated and gained more than 25,000 computers, equipment and software worth $13.6 million.
In 2010, Coles Supermarkets ran a similar program called "Sports for Schools" which customers collected coupons to hand in to their school in exchange for sports equipment. The program was run again in 2011, 2012, 2020 and 2018.
In 2018, Coles ran a collectibles promotion called Little Shop featuring mini-sized grocery items. Competitor Woolworths stated the success of the promotion led to reduced customer visits to its stores. Due to the success of the campaign, Coles re-invigorated the promotion with the collectables returning for the Christmas period.

Private label brands
In the past Coles had a variety of private labels, most notably Farmland and Embassy. Currently Coles has eight levels of generic or private label brands, although they plan to consolidate these into the basic Coles brand. They also have a private clothing brand.

Coles: A mid-price line, replacing the 'You'll love Coles' brand. Designed to match established branded products.
Coles Smart Buy: A budget label covering household essentials and groceries. Easily recognisable due to its plain white and red accented packaging. Replaced the previous 'Savings' and 'Farmland' brands. 
Coles Finest: A premium brand, with a small range of gourmet foods. Promoted as of greater quality than many well known branded products and often more expensive.
Coles Green Choice: A range of household products which claim to be environmentally responsible, with a donation being made to Clean Up Australia with every one of its products sold.
Coles Organic: A range of products grown and processed without the use of synthetic chemicals, fertilisers, pesticides or herbicides, approved by official certified organisations.
Coles Simply Less: A range of products designed for health conscious customers. Usually have lower fat, salt, or sugar levels than traditional products or are designed as a health products such as the Simply Less range of meal replacement shakes.
Coles Simply Gluten Free: A range of around 40 products designed for customers who are gluten intolerant or on a gluten free diet for other reasons.
 Mix Clothing: A range of budget essential clothing; mostly women's and children's clothing. Not available in all stores and being phased out nationally.
 Coles Ultra: A range of higher-end cleaning products above the smart buy range.

Halal and kosher products
Coles lists its parve/halal products, by category and by brand, on its website.

See also

 List of supermarket chains in Oceania
 Pick 'n Pay Hypermarket

References

External links

 

Supermarkets of Australia
Coles Group
Australian companies established in 1914
Retail companies established in 1914
Online retailers of Australia
Australian grocers